The Fort Rouge Curling Club is a curling club located in the Fort Rouge district of Winnipeg, Manitoba.

History
The Fort Rouge Curling Club joined the Manitoba Curling Association in 1915, while the Fort Rouge Ladies Curling Club was one of the founding members of the Manitoba Ladies Curling Association in 1924. In 1919, the first Fort Rouge Curling Club rink was built at the corner of Kylemore Avenue and Osborne Street. This building would later be demolished, and a new facility was built in 1959, a few blocks away on Daly Street where it stands today.

Champions

Men's
The Rouge was the home club of the 1972 World Championship winning team of Orest Meleschuk, Dave Romano, John Hanesiak and Pat Hailley, a team most notable for the "Curse of LaBonte" incident. The club has produced two other Canadian championship rinks, in 1952 and 1956 (pre-dating the World Championships), both skipped by Billy Walsh. The 1952 Brier championship team included Al Langlois, Andy McWilliams and John Watson while the 1956 championship team included Langlois, Cy White and McWilliams. The club is also home to the 2016 men's provincial champion rink, consisting of Mike McEwen, B. J. Neufeld, Matt Wozniak and Denni Neufeld.

Women's
The Rouge was also the home club of the 1984 World Women's Curling Championship winning team of Connie Laliberte, Chris More, Corinne Peters and Janet Arnott. Laliberte also won a bronze medal at the 1992 Canada Safeway World Women's Curling Championship with teammates Laurie Allen, Cathy Gauthier and Arnott and a silver medal at the 1995 Ford World Women's Curling Championship with Cathy Overton, Gauthier and Arnott. Teams from the Fort Rouge won numerous provincial women's championships, including:

1958: Esther Poulton, May Graham, Mary Chalmers, Dorothy Starr
1984: Laliberte, More, Peters, Arnott
1989: Chris More, Karen Purdy, Lori Zeller, Kristen Kuruluk
1992: Laliberte, Allen, Gauthier, Arnott
1994: Laliberte, Purdy, Gauthier, Arnott
1995: Laliberte, Purdy (replaced by Overton), Gauthier, Arnott
1999: Laliberte, Overton-Clapham, Debbie Jones-Walker, Arnott
2000: Overton-Clapham, Jill Staub, Jones-Walker, Arnott
2003: Barb Spencer, Darcy Robertson, Barb Enright, Faye Unrau
2006: Janet Harvey, Jill Thurston, Cherie-Ann Loder, Carey Burges
2009: Spencer, Robertson, Brette Richards, Barb Enright
2011: Overton-Clapham, Karen Fallis, Leslie Wilson, Raunora Westcott
2014: Chelsea Carey, Kristy McDonald, Kristen Foster, Lindsay Titheridge

Junior
Provincial junior championship rinks include:
 1990 women's: Nancy Malanchuk, Raili Walker, Jill Ursel, Natalie Claude
 1993 men's: Mike Mansell, Doug Pottinger, Jason Fuchs, Keith Marshall
 1995 men's: Chris Galbraith, Scott Cripps, Brent Barrett, Bryan Galbraith (Canadian Champions, World Bronze Medallists)
 2015 women's: Beth Peterson, Robyn Njegovan, Melissa Gordon, Breanne Yozenko
 2016 women's: Abby Ackland, Robyn Njegovan, Melissa Gordon, Sara Oliver

Senior
Provincial senior championship rinks include:
1999 men's: Ron Westcott, Neil Andrews, Bob Boughey, Ron Toews

Masters
Provincial masters championship rinks include:
1987 men's: Colin Milne, Mike Prymak, Jack Stoneman, Claude Reid
1988 men's: Ken Hilton, Colin Milne, Bud Snarr, George Lowe
1993 men's: Lyle Henry, Colin Milne, Fraser Muldrew, Jim Penston
2010 men's: Ron Westcott, Bob Jenion, Bob Boughey, Gary Smith
2012 men's: Ron Westcott, Bob Jenion, Bob Boughey, Gary Smith
2014 men's: Ron Westcott, Ken Dusablon, Bob Boughey, Ron Toews
2015 men's: Ron Westcott, Ken Dusablon, Bob Boughey, Howard Restall (Canadian Champions)

Travelers Curling Club Championship
The Fort Rouge Curling Club won the 2016 Travelers Curling Club Championship, women's division. Members of the winning team were Tracy Andries, Crystal Kennedy, Dianne Christensen and April Klassen.

References

Curl Manitoba past champions

External links
Fort Rouge Curling Club

Curling clubs in Canada
Sports venues in Winnipeg
Curling clubs established in 1915
1915 establishments in Manitoba
Curling in Manitoba
Curling_Club